Francine Pelletier (born 25 April 1959 in Laval, Quebec) is a Canadian science fiction writer, whose work often features strong female protagonists. She has been a winner of several literary prizes for science fiction, including the Prix Aurora Award.

She has published over 20 novels for young readers, mostly in the science fiction and mystery genres, and dozens of short stories, as well as a few science-fiction novels for adults. Some of her work has been translated into English.

Bibliography

Youth fiction

 Le Rendez-vous du désert (Paulines, Jeunesse-pop 59, 1987)
 Le Temps des migrations (Recueil, Le Préambule, Chroniques du futur 11, 1987)
 Jardins de lumière (Graficor, 1988)
 Mort sur le Redan (Paulines, Jeunesse-pop 64, 1988 )
 Le Crime de l'Enchanteresse (Paulines, Jeunesse-pop 66, 1989)
 Monsieur Bizarre (Paulines, Jeunesse-pop 70, 1990)
 Des vacances bizarres (Paulines, Jeunesse-pop 74, 1991)
 La Forêt de métal (Hurtubise HMH, Plus, 1991)
 Republished with same title for France market (Gamma jeunesse, 1994)
 Republished with same title for France market (L'Élan vert, 1998)
 Le Septième Écran (Paulines, Jeunesse-pop 80, 1992)
 La Saison de l'exil (Paulines, Jeunesse-pop 82, 1992)
 Par chemins inventés (Collectif, Québec/Amérique, Clip 10, 1992)
 La Bizarre Aventure (Paulines, Jeunesse-pop 86, 1993)
 La Planète du mensonge (Paulines, Jeunesse-pop 89, 1993)
 Le Cadavre dans la glissoire (Paulines, Jeunesse-pop 92, 1994)
 Une nuit bizarre (Médiaspaul, Jeunesse-pop 92, 1994)
 Le Fantôme de l'opérateur (Médiaspaul, Jeunesse-pop 109, 1996)
 Cher ancêtre (Médiaspaul, Jeunesse-pop 115, 1996)
 Damien mort ou vif (Médiaspaul, Jeunesse-pop 119, 1997)
 Une enquête de J.-P. (Médiaspaul, Jeunesse-Pop, 1998)
 Télé-rencontre (Hurtubise HMH, Plus, 1999)
 Les Eaux de Jade (Médiaspaul, Jeunesse-pop 134, 2000)
 Le Crime de Culdéric (Médiaspaul, Jeunesse-pop 141, 2001)

Science fiction

 Trilogie Le Sable et l'Acier
 Volume 1: Nelle de Vilvèq (Alire, Romans 011, 1997)
 Volume 2: Samiva de Frée (Alire, Romans 016, 1998)
 Volume 3: Issabel de Qohosaten (Alire, Romans 020, 1998)
 Les Jours de l'ombre (Alire, Romans 075, 2004).

Other stories

 Le Retour des gueux (Pour ta belle gueule d'ahuri 6, 1983)
 La Traversée d'Algir (imagine... 20, 1984)
 De silence et d'absence (Solaris 56, 1984)
 La Volière (imagine... 24, 1984)
 La Voyageuse (Moebius 23, 1984)
 Le Seuil d'Ashoran (imagine... 27, 1985)
 La Rébellion de Toby Arden (in Aurores Boréales 2,Le Préambule, Chroniques du futur 9, 1985)
 Interférences (Pandore 2, 1985)
 Instant (in Dix nouvelles de science-fiction québécoise, Quinze, 1985)
 L'Enfant d'Asterman (in Planéria, Tisseyre, Conquêtes, 1985)
 La Migratrice (Solaris 63, 1985)
 English version: The Mother Migrator (in TesseractsQ, Tesseract Books, 1996)
 Cher Ancêtre (imagine... 39, 1987)
 En bout de ligne (Solaris 73, 1987)
 Le Château de fer (Faërie/Mondes imaginaires 1, 1988)
 La Petite (imagine... 46, 1988)
 English version: Guinea Pig (in Tesseracts 3, Press Porcépic, 1990)
 Le Tiers de l'avenir (in C.I.N.Q., Logiques, Autres mers, autres mondes 4, 1989)
 Tu verras (imagine... 48, 1989)
 Eaux mortes, eaux vives (Solaris 87, 1989)
 Les Noms de l'oubli (in Sous des soleils étrangers, Publications Ianus, 1989)
 DernièrePhase (Arcade 18, 1989)
 Promenons-nous dans les bois (Le Sabord 25, 1990)
 Cocon en sous-location (XYZ 22, 1990)
 Voyage à Paris (Samizdat 17, 1990)
 La Collection Galloway (Solaris 101, 1992)
 Cloche vaine (Solaris 109, 1994)
 Reparution dans Escales sur Solaris (Vents d'Ouest, Rafales, 1995)
 Version anglaise: Empty Ring (in Tesseracts 5, Tesseract Books, 1996)
 Les Radis de la colère (in Le Bal des ombres, Québec/Amérique, Clip 17, 1994)
 Adieu Arkadie (Samizdat 25, 1994)
 La Fin de la journée (in Fou Rire, Ashem Fictions, 1995)
 Navices (collaboration avec Yves Meynard) (Solaris 115, 1995)
 La Maison douleur (in La Maison douleur et autres histoires de peur, Vents d'Ouest, Ado 2, 1996)
 Retour sur Arkadie (in Concerto pour six voix, Médiaspaul, Jeunesse-pop 121, 1997)
 Sans titre (in Roberval fantastique, Ashem fictions, 1998)
 Un lit de caillou (Solaris 140, 2002)

Awards and recognition 
 1981: Prix Boréal, Concours "Écriture sur place" for Le Retour des gueux
 1983: Prix Boréal, Concours "Écriture sur place" for La Traversée d'Algir
 1988: Grand Prix de la science-fiction et du fantastique québécois (Quebec science fiction and fantary award) for La Petite Fille du silence
 1988: Prix Boréal for Le Temps des migrations
 1992: Award "Artiste jeune carrière" (young career artist) from City of Laval
 1999: Grand Prix de la science-fiction et du fantastique québécois (Quebec science fiction and fantary award) for Samiva de Frée et Issabel de Qohosaten
 1999: Prix Boréal for Samiva de Frée

References
 Some material was based on the corresponding French Wikipedia article on Francine Pelletier.

External links

 Famous Canadian Women: On the Job – Writers , retrieved 2007-01-25
 Author profile at Éditions Alire

1959 births
Canadian science fiction writers
Writers from Quebec
Living people
People from Laval, Quebec
Women science fiction and fantasy writers
Canadian women novelists
Canadian writers of young adult literature
Canadian mystery writers
Canadian short story writers in French
20th-century Canadian novelists
21st-century Canadian novelists
20th-century Canadian women writers
21st-century Canadian women writers
Canadian novelists in French
Canadian women short story writers
Women writers of young adult literature
20th-century Canadian short story writers
21st-century Canadian short story writers
Women mystery writers